Dobang (都房), also written as Tobang, was a Goryeo Dynasty private military unit that originated as the personal body guard for Gyeong Dae-seung (경대승). After the military revolt of the generals in 1170 during the reign of King Uijong of Goryeo, a series of generals culminating in the Choe military dictators, held the real power in Goryeo. In their first year, General Yi Go (이고) was murdered by General Yi Ui-Bang (이의방) who subsequently died at the hands of Jeong Gyun (정균). Jeong's father, Jeong Jung-bu (정중부).

Jeong Jung-bu next held sway for several years until he was overthrown by Gyeong Dae-seung.

Gyeong Dae-seung was the next to last general to seize power before the Choe family gained and consolidated military control for a longer period of time. Noting the great personal risk that had plagued the previous generals, Gyeong Dae-seung organized a personal bodyguard of 100 troops, known as the Dobang, which attended him at all times.  The Dobang disbanded upon Gyeong Dae-seung's death but was reconstituted by Choe Chung-heon (최충헌) shortly after he came to power. Choe expanded the Dobang and divided it into six units (Yuk-beon 육번) which became known as the Yuk-beon Dobang (육번도방) This enabled a regular rotation of the guards. When Choe U (최우) came to power, his private army became known as the Inner Dobang (Nae Dobang, 내도방) and the Outer Tobang (Woe Dobang, 외도방).

See also
Goryeo
History of Korea

Goryeo
Military history of Korea